The Church of Saint Lawrence in Prague is a church of the Old Catholic Church of the Czech Republic. It is located on Petřín hill, next to Petřín Lookout Tower and the Hunger Wall. It was originally a Romanesque church, later rebuilt in the Baroque style by Kilian Ignaz Dientzenhofer.

External links

Churches in Prague
Old Catholic church buildings
Catholic cathedrals in the Czech Republic
Kilian Ignaz Dientzenhofer buildings
Church buildings with domes
Petřín